Arjun is a young fictional detective character of Bengali literature. He lives at Jalpaiguri in West Bengal The character was created by Samaresh Majumdar in 1983. Arjun's mentor is retired official cop, Mr. Amal Shome. Although Arjun himself solves the cases but he works most of the time as an assistant of Shome.

Books of Arjun series

Adaptations
 Based on Sitaharan Rahasya and Khunkharapi, a film was released in 2013 named Arjun: Kalimpong E Sitaharan.. A Hindi tele-serial was released as Jungle Ki Gaherai Mey, based on Arjun novel, Derdin. Kaushik Sen played the role of Arjun.
 On 18 July 2022, Radio Mirchi Kolkata (98.3 MHz) station aired the story "Der Din" on the Sunday Suspense show. The character of Arjun was voiced by Indrashish Roy.

References

Further reading

Fictional Bengali people
Fictional Indian people
Fictional amateur detectives